Leucania latiuscula is a moth of the family Noctuidae. It is native to the Caribbean and might be introduced to Hawaii.

Taxonomy
Leucania latiuscula is part of a species group including Leucania subpunctata and Leucania senescens. These three species are so similar, they can only be distinguished by examination of genitalia. Until recently, subpunctata and senescens were considered synonyms of latiuscula.

External links
Moths of Jamaica

Leucania
Moths described in 1868